Mr. Schneider goes to Washington is a 2007 American tongue-in-cheek documentary film by Jonathan Neil Schneider that takes a look at campaign financing in Washington.  The film debuted at the New Orleans Film Festival in 2007, and was released on DVD in 2008.

Background
Schneider was inspired to make his documentary after watching a 2004 Senator Ernest Hollings interview on 60 Minutes in which Holings lambasted the influence of money and lobbyists on the political process.  He resigned from producing America’s Next Top Model and other television shows to fund his own documentary about campaign finances.

The film is a collection of interviews with lobbyists, lawmakers, government watchdogs, and porn stars, speaking about the influence of campaign contributions on politics and politicians. The adult film actors discuss a statement Jack Oliver had made about how Americans spend more money on pornography than they do on politics.  Schneider had wished to include footage of a fundraising video produced by Senator Mike Crapo but, when Schneider was not allowed its use, he instead  recruited homeless people to recreate scenes from the video.

Synopsis
Frustrated by Washington and his apathy towards it, Mr. Schneider is finally shaken off his comfortable couch and compelled to storm to the capital of the world’s only superpower to find out what is going on with his government.  Quickly, Mr. Schneider discovers that things in Washington are even worse than he imagined. Because of their dependence on big business and special interests to finance their political futures, almost every decision the President, Vice-President and Members of Congress make is corrupted. After all, there is no bigger issue facing our political leaders than getting re-elected. From education to health care, social security to taxes, foreign policy to gas prices, Americans’ interests repeatedly take a back seat to that of special interests.
Amazingly, Washington’s political elite agrees. Lobbyists, Members of Congress, lawyers, even the Commissioner of the agency responsible for regulating the influence of money in Washington candidly admit this is the most destructive influence on American democracy.  Yet no one seems to care. More people voted for their favorite American Idol candidate than for their favorite candidate for President of the United States. We care more about the marital status of our favorite celebrity than what our elected leaders are doing in Washington.  This isn't lost on the media, whose news coverage reflects its audience’s preoccupation. The result: a population of uniformed, disengaged and disenfranchised non-voters hold the world’s only super power in check.

Cast

 Jonathan Neil Schneider
 Patrick Basham
 Tony Coelho
 Michael Clayton
 Danny Davis
 Jehmu Greene
 Bill Hillsman
 Nikki Hunter
 Dennis Johnson
 Sunny Lane
 David Mindich
 John Leboutillier
 Trevor Potter
 Tony Parker as Lobbyist A
 Christopher Shays
 Rodney Smith
 Scott Thomas
 Steve Weissman
 Wright Andrews
 Jan Witlod Barron
 Johan Bloom
 Mike Fraioli
 Craig Holman
 Kevin Michael Key as Senator Mike Crapo
 Amanda Scarnati
 Barbara Lippert
 Sashae Siaibi as Lobbyist B
 Steve Weiss
 Lexi Tyler
 Adam Morse

Reception
The 2007 New Orleans Film Festival wrote, "Amazingly Mr. Schneider has made a film about corruption and apathy that is informative, entertaining and enraging."

The 2007 Cucalorus Film Festival wrote, "Not all political documentaries are dull and staid, this one has porn stars. Perhaps it’s what you’d expect from a reality producer, but the result is a virtual makeover of the genre to make it fresh and fun."

In March 2008, Lee Iacocca praised the film, calling it a "fantastic documentary film" which was timely, funny, and entertaining, and recommended "to all my friends in the media, if you want to know what Lee Iacocca thinks is wrong with politics, watch Mr. Schneider Goes to Washington."

References

External links
 
 

2007 films
Documentary films about elections in the United States
American documentary films
2000s English-language films
2000s American films